Itabashi Azusawa Gymnasium is an arena in Itabashi, Tokyo, Japan. It is the home arena of the Tokyo Excellence of the B.League, Japan's professional basketball league.  This building does not meet the requirements of the B2 license and caused Tokyo Ex's relegation to B3 twice.

References

Basketball venues in Japan
Indoor arenas in Japan
Sports venues in Tokyo
Tokyo Excellence
Itabashi
Sports venues completed in 1968
1968 establishments in Japan